Erythrina caffra, the coast coral tree or African coral tree, is a tree native to southeastern Africa, which is often cultivated and has introduced populations in California and India.  All the 17 species of coral tree in the genus Erythrina are collectively considered the official tree of Los Angeles, California in the United States.

Description

Erythrina caffra is a medium to large deciduous tree. It grows in coastal bushes and riverine forests along the south eastern coast of South Africa and up into Zululand.

Leaves

The compound leaves are made up of three leaflets. Each leaflet is broadly ovate to elliptical. The leaflets do not have prickles and are hairless.

Flowers

The flowers are made up of a main petal and four small petals. The main petal curves back to expose the stamens. The flower colour is warm red to scarlet. This is one of the main differences between Erythrina caffra and Erythrina lysistemon. The flowers form stalked axillary racemes up to 100mm long.

Trunk

The bark is reasonably smooth with thorns every now and then. The younger the branch the sharper the thorns.

Gallery

References

External links 
 

caffra